Nicole Briscoe ( Manske; born July 2, 1980) is an American sportscaster who is employed by ESPN. Originally focused on covering auto racing for the network, which included stints as the host of NASCAR Countdown and NASCAR Now, Briscoe became a SportsCenter anchor in 2015.  She is married to IndyCar Series driver Ryan Briscoe.

Early life 
A native of Roscoe, Illinois, she graduated from Hononegah High School in 1998. She and future auto racer Danica Patrick were cheerleaders there in 1996.

Nicole won the Miss Illinois Teen USA 1998 and competed in the Miss Teen USA pageant in Shreveport, Louisiana, in August 1998.  Nicole was a semi-finalist in the pageant, placing third (of 10) in the evening gown competition, seventh in swimsuit and tenth in interview, placing her eighth overall on average. Two years after passing on her title, she competed in the Miss Illinois USA 2001 pageant and placed first runner-up to Rebecca Ambrosi.

Early career
Nicole attended Northern Illinois University in Dekalb, Illinois, earning her first job while at Northern Illinois for WREX-TV, the NBC station in Rockford.  She worked as a general assignment reporter for WANE-TV in Fort Wayne, Indiana, before going to WISH-TV in Indianapolis, Indiana, in April 2004.  During her career at WISH-TV, Nicole covered the Indianapolis 500, the United States Grand Prix, the NFL's Indianapolis Colts, and the NBA's Indiana Pacers.  She was also a pit reporter for the Indianapolis Motor Speedway Radio Network.  
In the May 15, 2006, edition of The Indianapolis Star, Nicole announced that she would be leaving WISH-TV for Speed Channel in Charlotte, North Carolina, with the 2006 Indianapolis 500 on May 28 being her last day.

Nicole was the co-host of The Speed Report (formerly Speed News), a Sunday motorsports program on Speed Channel.
She replaced Connie LeGrand, and hosted the show from July 1, 2006, to January 27, 2008, when she left to become the new host of the daily news show NASCAR Now on ESPN2.

Current career
From 2008 to 2014, Briscoe co-hosted the NASCAR pre-race shown on ESPN/ABC. Since 2015, she has served as a SportsCenter anchor.

Personal life
She married Ryan Briscoe in an outdoor ceremony in Hawaii in 2009 and they have since had daughters. In 2018, Ryan became a naturalized American citizen.

References

External links
Nicole Briscoe ESPN Bio
Indianapolis 500 coverage with Danica Patrick
Miss Teen USA 1998 competition (Shown as Miss Illinois Teen USA)
Indianapolis Star column on Manske's dating of 2005 Indy 500 winner 
Indianapolis Star column on Manske's departure from WISH-TV to SPEED Channel.

Hononegah Community High School alumni
Television anchors from Indianapolis
Television anchors from Fort Wayne, Indiana
Living people
1998 beauty pageant contestants
20th-century Miss Teen USA delegates
Motorsport announcers
ESPN people
Northern Illinois University alumni
People from Charlotte, North Carolina
People from Rockford, Illinois
People from Wausau, Wisconsin
People from Indianapolis
Journalists from Illinois
People from Roscoe, Illinois
American women television journalists
1980 births
Racing drivers' wives and girlfriends